The Tŏkch'ŏn is a series of tracked artillery pieces developed by North Korea in the 1970s and 1980s.

Design
The Tŏkch'ŏn makes use of a locally produced variant of the Soviet ATS-59 artillery tractor as a chassis to mount with a variety of existing Soviet towed artillery designs.

Versions
Tokchon 122mm (M-1981): ATS-59 chassis with D-74 122 mm field gun, could also carry 9K38 Igla
Tokchon 152mm (M-1974): ATS-59 chassis with 152 mm towed gun-howitzer M1955 (D-20)
Tokchon 130mm (M-1975): ATS-59 chassis with 130 mm towed field gun M1954 (M-46)
Tokchon 130mm (M-1991): ATS-59 chassis with SM-4-1 coastal defense gun, could also carry 9K38 Igla
Tokchon 130mm (M-1972): ATS-59 chassis with 100 mm field gun M1944 (BS-3), could also carry 9K38 Igla
M-1978 with twin 37mm AA cannon.Some have glass viewport for driver.

Operators
Current operators
 
  - Used by Houthis in current civil war, at least 3 units were destroyed by Saudi forces.

References 

Tracked self-propelled howitzers
Self-propelled artillery of North Korea